CUS may refer to:
 Cambridge Union Society
 Canadian Union of Students
 Critical university studies
 Catholic University School
 Chicago Union Station
 Commonwealth of Unrecognized States
 Concordia University System
 Confederation of Labour Unification in Nicaragua
 Constitution of the United States
 Copper monosulfide (CuS)
 Urban Community of Strasbourg
 "C.U.S.", a song by Norther
 Cus D'Amato, American boxing manager and trainer who handled the careers of Mike Tyson, Floyd Patterson, and José Torres
 Centro Universitario Sportivo, Italian sport governing body (at university level). Locally version, in the various cities, of Centro Universitario Sportivo Italiano (for example CUS Rome, Cus Milan...)
 Custom House station, London, England (National Rail station code)
 Computer user satisfaction

See also 

 
 Cuss (disambiguation)
 Kus (disambiguation)